David Muñoz may refer to:

 David Muñoz (director) (born 1968), Spanish director, producer and screenwriter
 David Muñoz (chef) (born 1980), Spanish chef
 David Muñoz (cyclist) (born 1979), Spanish cyclist
 David Muñoz (motorcyclist) (born 2006), Spanish motorcyclist
 David Muñoz (sport shooter) (born 1964), Panamanian sports shooter
 David Ibarra Muñoz (born 1930), Mexican economist
 David Muñoz (footballer) (born 1997), Spanish footballer